On 14 December 2022, a suspected suicide bomber blew himself up in Miran Shah, North Waziristan, killing at least three people and injuring five.

See also
 2022 Miranshah suicide bombing

References

2022 murders in Pakistan
December 2022 crimes in Asia
December 2022 events in Pakistan
Mass murder in 2022
Suicide bombings in 2022
Terrorist incidents in Pakistan in 2022